Lecithocera baeopis is a moth in the family Lecithoceridae. It was described by Edward Meyrick in 1929. It is found in Assam, India.

The wingspan is about 11 mm. The forewings are whitish ochreous speckled with grey. The stigmata are black, the first discal and plical are very small, the plical hardly posterior, the second discal moderate, there is a similar dot just above the dorsum rather before it. There are some small ill-defined blackish terminal dots. The hindwings are grey.

References

Moths described in 1929
baeopis